Poseidon Pond is a pond,  long, lying in Thomas Valley in the eastern Olympus Range, McMurdo Dry Valleys. It was named in association with the names from Greek mythology grouped in this range by the New Zealand Geographic Board in 1998 after Poseidon, god of the sea, whose mythological home was Mount Olympus.

References

McMurdo Dry Valleys